Vilmos Totik (Mosonmagyaróvár, March 8, 1954) is a Hungarian mathematician, working in classical analysis, harmonic analysis, orthogonal polynomials, approximation theory, potential theory. He is a professor of the University of Szeged. Since 1989 he is also a part-time professor at the University of South Florida (Tampa).

He received the Lester R. Ford Award in 2000 for his expository article A tale of two integrals. He is a corresponding member (1993), member of the Hungarian Academy of Sciences (2001). In 2015 he was elected as a fellow of the American Mathematical Society "for contributions to classical analysis and approximation theory and for exposition."

His books
  Z. Ditzian, V. Totik: Moduli of smoothness,  Springer Series in Computational Mathematics, 9,  Springer-Verlag, New York, 1987. x+227 pp. 
  Herbert Stahl, Vilmos Totik: General orthogonal polynomials, Encyclopedia of Mathematics and its Applications, 43 Cambridge University Press, Cambridge, 1992. xii+250 pp. 
 V. Totik: Weighted approximation with varying weight, Lecture Notes in Mathematics, 1569.  Springer-Verlag, Berlin, vi+114 p. (1994). 
  Edward B. Saff, Vilmos Totik: Logarithmic potentials with external fields, Appendix B by Thomas Bloom. Grundlehren der Mathematischen Wissenschaften 316 Springer-Verlag, Berlin, 1997. xvi+505 pp. 
 Péter Komjáth, Vilmos Totik: Problems and Theorems in Classical Set Theory, Springer-Verlag, Berlin, 2006. 
 Vilmos Totik: Metric Properties of Harmonic Measures'', 163 pp, American  Mathematical Society, 2006,

References

External links
 Homepage at USF
 

1954 births
Living people
Members of the Hungarian Academy of Sciences
Mathematical analysts
Approximation theorists
20th-century Hungarian mathematicians
21st-century Hungarian mathematicians
Fellows of the American Mathematical Society